Wyoming station is a SEPTA subway stop in Philadelphia. It serves the Broad Street Line and is located in the Logan neighborhood of North Philadelphia at 4700 North Broad Street and Wyoming Avenue. This is a local station, and thus has four tracks, with only the outer two being served. There are separate fare control areas for the northbound and southbound platforms, and no crossover exists.

Station layout

Gallery

References

External links 

SEPTA Broad Street Line stations
Railway stations in the United States opened in 1928
Railway stations in Philadelphia
Railway stations located underground in Pennsylvania
1928 establishments in Pennsylvania